Rosa María Silva (born 21 September 1968) is a Uruguayan swimmer. She competed in two events at the 1984 Summer Olympics.

References

1968 births
Living people
Uruguayan female swimmers
Olympic swimmers of Uruguay
Swimmers at the 1984 Summer Olympics
Place of birth missing (living people)